The following is a timeline of the history of the city of Caen, France.

Prior to 19th century

 912 – Caen becomes western capital of Normandy.
 1060 – Château de Caen (castle) built by William the Conqueror (approximate date).
 1063 - Abbey of Saint-Étienne, Caen founded by William the Conqueror.
 1077 –  consecrated.
 1087 – Burial of William the Conqueror.
 1314 – Public clock installed.
 1346 – Battle of Caen (1346).
 1417 – Siege of Caen (1417) by English forces.
 1432 – University of Caen Normandy founded by Henry VI of England.
 1450 – Siege of Caen (1450); French in power.
 1460s –  (residence) construction begins.
 1480 – Printing press in operation.
 1527 –  (mansion) built (approximate date).
 1540 –  (mansion) built.
 1652 – Académie des Sciences, Arts et Belles-Lettres de Caen founded.
 1710 –  (mansion) construction begins (approximate date).
 1736 – Jardin des plantes de Caen (garden) established.
 1790 – Caen becomes part of the Calvados souveraineté.
 1793
 Agitation by the Girondins.
 Population: 34,805.
 1796 –  established.

19th century
 1809 – Musée des Beaux-Arts de Caen and  open.
 1820 – Société de médecine de Caen (medical society) founded.
 1821 –  established.
 1823 –  (learned society) founded.
 1824 –  (historical society) founded.
 1828 – Journal de Caen et de la Normandie newspaper begins publication.(fr)
 1843 – Paris-Caen railway begins operating.
 1855 -  (art society) founded.
 1857
 Caen Canal opens.
 Gare de Caen opens
 Mantes-la-Jolie–Cherbourg railway begins operating.
 1860 –  built.
 1875
 Compagnie du chemin de fer de Caen à la mer railway begins operating.
 Gare de Caen Saint-Martin (rail station) opens.
 1886 – Population: 43,809.

20th century

 1901 – Tram begins operating.
 1911 – Population: 46,934.
 1913 – Stade Malherbe Caen association football club formed.
 1925 – Stade de Venoix (stadium) opens.
 1934 – Gare de Caen (railway station) rebuilt.
 1939 – Military  established.
 1940 – German occupation begins.
 1944
 June–August: Battle for Caen fought, during the Battle of Normandy.
 19 July: German forces ousted from city.
 1945 –  begins.
 Yves Guillou becomes mayor
 1954 – Population: 67,851.
 1959 – Jean-Marie Louvel becomes mayor.
 1961 – Lycée Malherbe built.
 1962
  (Lycée) opens in  neighborhood.
 Caen twinned with Würzburg, Germany.
 1965 – City Hall moves into the Abbey of Saint-Étienne building.
 1967 – Civilian Caen – Carpiquet Airport in use.
 1968 – Population: 110,262.
 1970 – Jean-Marie Girault becomes mayor.
 1973 – Canton of Caen-1, 2, 3, 4, 5, and  created.
 1982 – Orchestre Régional de Basse-Normandie established in nearby Mondeville.
 1986 –  opens.
 1987 – Caen twinned with Portsmouth, United Kingdom.
 1988 – Mémorial de Caen opens.
 1991 – Caen twinned with Alexandria, Virginia and Nashville, USA.
 1992 – Caen twinned with Thiès, Senegal.
 1993 – Stade Michel d'Ornano (stadium) opens.
 1999 – Population: 113,987.

21st century
 2001 – Brigitte Le Brethon becomes mayor
 2002 – Caen Guided Light Transit (TVR) begins operating.
 2008 – Philippe Duron becomes mayor
 2012 – Population: 108,365.
 2014 – Joël Bruneau becomes mayor.
 2015 – December:  held.
 2016 – Caen becomes part of Normandy.
 2017 – Caen Guided Light Transit ends operating.
 2019 – Caen tramway begins operating.

See also
 History of Caen
 
 List of mayors of Caen
 
 History of Normandy region

other cities in the Normandy region
 Timeline of Le Havre
 Timeline of Rouen

References

This article incorporates information from the French Wikipedia.

Bibliography

in English

in French

External links

 Items related to Caen, various dates (via Europeana).
 Items related to Caen, various dates (via Digital Public Library of America).

caen
Caen
caen